FRPS may refer to:

 Familial rectal pain syndrome, the original name for the paroxysmal extreme pain disorder
 Fellow of the Royal Photographic Society
 Flora Republicae Popularis Sinicae
 Fall River Public Schools

See also 
 FRP (disambiguation)